The list of ship commissionings in 1976 includes a chronological list of all ships commissioned in 1976.


See also 

1976
 Ship commissionings